The Düsseldorf tramway network is a network of tramways serving Düsseldorf, the capital city of the federal state of North Rhine-Westphalia, Germany.  In combination with the Düsseldorf Stadtbahn and Rhine-Ruhr S-Bahn, it forms the backbone of the public transport system in Düsseldorf.

The tramway network is currently operated by Rheinbahn AG, and is integrated in the Verkehrsverbund Rhein-Ruhr (VRR).

History

In 1876, the first horse-drawn tram line opened in Düsseldorf operated by the Belgian entrepreneur Leopold Boyaert. It joined Castle Square with the Bergisch-Märkischen station and the concert hall.

In 1896, the first electric tram ran in Düsseldorf, and the full conversion of the system to electricity continued through 1900.

Lines 

After finishing work at the Wehrhahlinie, many of the tram lines (703, 712, 713 and 715) have been moved to the new Stadtbahn service.

Rolling stock 
The current tram fleet consists of low-floor trams which are good for wheelchair accessibility.

In the media 
A version of the Tramway is playable in the German simulator LOTUS as paid-DLC with the map set in 1981 with tram lines 76, 710, 705,715 from Düsseldorf Hauptbahnhof to Krefeld* and Hoterheide.

*map doesn't yet continue on to Krefeld Hbf yet as of 1/AUG/2022.

See also

 Düsseldorf Stadtbahn
 Rhine-Ruhr S-Bahn
 Rhein-Ruhr Stadtbahn
 Verkehrsverbund Rhein-Ruhr
 List of town tramway systems in Germany
 Trams in Germany

References

Notes

Bibliography

External links

 Rheinbahn - official site 
 Rheinbahn - official site 
 Düsseldorf network map (pdf) 
 
 

Dusseldorf
Transport in Düsseldorf
Dusseldorf